Midre Almeric Cummings (born October 14, 1971) is an American former professional baseball outfielder, who played in Major League Baseball (MLB) for the Pittsburgh Pirates (-), Philadelphia Phillies (1997), Boston Red Sox ( and ), Minnesota Twins (-2000), Arizona Diamondbacks, Tampa Bay Devil Rays, and Baltimore Orioles. He spent  with the La New Bears of the Chinese Professional Baseball League (CPBL).

Amateur career
Cummings was born and raised in the United States Virgin Islands. Given that there was no high school baseball in the U.S. Virgin Islands, Cummings "played in a lot of open leagues, amateur leagues" sometimes against players as old as 21 when he was only 16. In 1987, he played for the St. Croix team which represented the U.S. Virgin Islands at the 1987 Senior League World Series. Cummings moved to Miami for his senior year of high school so that he could play baseball at Miami Edison Senior High School in the hopes of earning a college baseball scholarship. Cummings had a .400 batting average in his only season of high school baseball. Prior to the 1990 Major League Baseball draft, one talent evaluator said Cummings "could outrun Vince Coleman." Another said he was "the best outfielder to ever play in Dade County."

Professional career
Cummings was drafted by the Minnesota Twins in the 1st round (29th overall) of the 1990 Major League Baseball Draft. On March 17, he was traded by the Twins along with Denny Neagle to the Pirates for John Smiley, making his major league debut for the Pirates in 1993. In his fifth season with the Pirates, he was claimed off waivers by the Phillies on July 8. Cummings was released by the Phillies on February 24, 1998, and signed with the Cincinnati Reds three days later only to be claimed off waivers by the Red Sox in spring training. The Red Sox released him on March 30, 1999, and Cummings signed with the Twins on May 14. On August 31, 2000, he was traded to the Red Sox for minor leaguer Hector De Los Santos. Cummings became a free agent after the season and signed with the Arizona Diamondbacks.

Cummings helped the Diamondbacks win the 2001 World Series over the New York Yankees, scoring the tying run in the ninth inning during Game 7. It would be three years before Cummings played in the majors again, spending time in the Milwaukee Brewers and Chicago Cubs minor league systems from -. On February 10, 2004, he signed with the Devil Rays and batted .278 in 54 at bats that year. He was released after the season and signed with the Baltimore Orioles, but got only two at bats that year and retired after the season.

Cummings signed with the La New Bears of the Chinese Professional Baseball League for the 2006 season.

References

External links

Midre Cummings at SABR (Baseball BioProject)

1971 births
Living people
Arizona Diamondbacks players
Baltimore Orioles players
Boston Red Sox players
Buffalo Bisons (minor league) players
Calgary Cannons players
Carolina Mudcats players
Durham Bulls players
Expatriate baseball players in Taiwan
Gulf Coast Twins players
Indianapolis Indians players
Iowa Cubs players
Kenosha Twins players
Major League Baseball outfielders
Major League Baseball players from the United States Virgin Islands
Major League Baseball designated hitters
Minnesota Twins players
New Britain Rock Cats players
Ottawa Lynx players
People from Saint Croix, U.S. Virgin Islands
Pittsburgh Pirates players
Philadelphia Phillies players
Salem Buccaneers players
Salt Lake Buzz players
Tampa Bay Devil Rays players
Tucson Sidewinders players
United States Virgin Islands expatriate baseball players in Canada
La New Bears players